James "Tony" Carroll was a Scottish professional footballer who played for Strathclyde, Belfast Celtic, Shelbourne, Clyde, Leicester City, Luton Town and Ayr United. A small, fast winger he was part of a Leicester City team that won Football League Division Two in 1936–37. During World War II he was declared "Lost at Sea" but was rescued, and went on to work as a crane operator in Glasgow.

Honours
with Leicester City
Football League Division Two
Champions - 1936–37

References

1906 births
Footballers from Glasgow
Association football wingers
Scottish footballers
Clyde F.C. players
Belfast Celtic F.C. players
Strathclyde F.C. players
Leicester City F.C. players
Luton Town F.C. players
Shelbourne F.C. players
Ayr United F.C. players
Motherwell F.C. non-playing staff
Scottish Football League players
English Football League players
Year of death missing
British military personnel of World War II
People declared dead in absentia